Glacier Peak or Dakobed (known in the Sauk-Suiattle dialect of the Lushootseed language as "Tda-ko-buh-ba" or "Takobia") is the most isolated of the five major stratovolcanoes (composite volcanoes) of the Cascade Volcanic Arc in the U.S state of  Washington. Located in the Glacier Peak Wilderness in Mount Baker–Snoqualmie National Forest, the volcano is visible from the west in Seattle, and from the north in the higher areas of eastern suburbs of Vancouver such as Coquitlam, New Westminster and Port Coquitlam. The volcano is the fourth tallest peak in Washington state, and not as much is known about it compared to other volcanoes in the area. Local Native Americans have recognized Glacier Peak and other Washington volcanoes in their histories and stories. When American explorers reached the region, they learned basic information about surrounding landforms, but did not initially understand that Glacier Peak was a volcano. From locations in northern Seattle and northward, Glacier Peak is closer than the more famous Mount Rainier (Tahoma), but as Glacier Peak is set farther into the Cascades and almost  shorter, it is much less noticeable than Mount Rainier.

Glacier Peak is one of the most active of Washington's volcanoes. The volcano formed during the Pleistocene epoch, about one million years ago, and since the most recent ice age, it has produced some of the largest and most explosive eruptions in the state. When continental ice sheets retreated from the region, Glacier Peak began to erupt regularly, erupting explosively five times in the past 3,000 years. It has erupted repeatedly during at least six periods; two of these eruptions have been among the largest in Washington.

Geology 
Remnants of past (prehistoric) lava domes are main components of the summit of the volcano, in addition to its false summit, Disappointment Peak. Past pyroclastic flow deposits are easily visible in river valleys near the volcano, likely caused by lava dome collapse, along with ridges found east of the summit consisting of ash cloud remains. On its western flank, the volcano also has a lahar, or mudflow deposit, which runs for about  into the White Chuck River Valley around 14,000 years ago. Ten other pyroclastic flow deposits are visible, all identified as relatively 10,000 years old. Another lahar, of unidentified age, was rich in oxyhornblende dacite; and continued for  into the Sauk River.

There are also ash cloud deposits on the opposite eastern flank of the volcano. Studies of the mountain have to date been unable to find any correspondence with pyroclastic flows, but several past mudflows have been identified. However, this large mudflow is part of a  concentration of past incidents at the volcano that spans the Dusty and Chocolate Creek. In the area at least  of lithic debris are contained. Tephra deposits are for the most part constrained to the left flank of the volcano, and at least nine past incidents have been identified. These form several layers of tephra constructing the mountain. Smaller eruptions involving tephra occurred between 6,900 and 5,500 years ago, again between 3,450 and 200 years ago, and as recently as 316 to 90 years ago.

On the mountain, about  up, are three additional cinder cones — one at the head of White Chuck River, one at Dishpan Gap, and one near Indian Pass. The volcano has also caused thermal events such as hot springs. There were three hot springs on the mountain: Gamma, Kennedy, and Sulphur, but Kennedy Hot Springs was destroyed and buried in a slide.

Tectonic setting 

The volcano is located in Washington, and is one of the five major stratovolcanoes there. Situated in the Cascade Volcanic Arc, the volcano was created by subduction of the oceanic Juan de Fuca Plate under the North American Plate. This range has been volcanically active for about 36 million years, and the rocks that make up its volcanoes are between 55 and 42 million years old. Eruptions within the range are irregular and do not occur all at once. In an attempt to organize the volcanoes by age, scientists typically divide them into the High Cascades, younger volcanoes, and the Western Cascades, consisting of the older volcanoes. However, the vents in Washington are all of different ages so none of its volcanoes are included in either of the sections.

History 
Around the area, there were many Native Americans, and along with other Washington volcanoes, the mountain was recognized by them as a spirit. When European-American explorers reached the area, they learned about the mountain, though only partially, through local legends. Although the local people described Glacier Peak as a vital part of their storytelling and beliefs; when other volcanoes in the area were mapped, Glacier Peak was left out. In 1850 natives mentioned the volcano to naturalist George Gibbs saying that the volcano had once "smoked". In 1898 the volcano was finally documented on a map.

Native Americans also used the area around the Cascades for their agriculture, leading them to often congregate in the region. As a result, gold miners eventually reached the area in the 1870s–1890s, searching for resources and rich land. The first white man recorded to observe the mountain—Daniel Lindsley—was an employee of the Northern Pacific Railroad Company searching for possible railroad routes when he saw it in 1870.

Eruptive history 

Another Cascade Arc volcano with similar geomorphology is the Mount Meager massif in southwestern British Columbia, Canada, which is situated on a  ridge of nonvolcanic, crystalline and metamorphic rock.

Of the five major volcanoes in Washington, only Glacier Peak and Mount St. Helens have had large eruptions in the past 15,000 years. Since both volcanoes generate magma of dacitic origin, the viscous magma builds up since it cannot flow through the eruptive vent. Gradually, the pressure grows, culminating in an explosion that ejects materials such as tephra, which in its simplest form, is ash.

Tephrochronology and radiocarbon dating indicate that Glacier Peak eruptions occurred in 1700 AD ± 100 years, 1300 AD ± 300 years, 900 AD ± 50 years, 200 AD ± 50 years, 850 BC, 3150 BC, and in 3550 BC. The Volcanic Explosivity Index (VEI) for three of these was 2 to 4, small compared to the 5 of the 1980 eruption of Mount St. Helens. They were characterized mainly by a central vent eruption, followed by an explosive eruption. These eruptions varied in outcome; some produced lahars, some pyroclastic flows, and others lava domes.

A little more than 13,000 years ago, a sequence of nine tephra eruptions occurred within a period of less than a few hundred years. Associated with these eruptions were pyroclastic flows. Mixed with snow, ice and water, these formed lahars that raced into three nearby rivers, filling their valleys with deep deposits. Subsequently, the mudflows drained into both the North Fork of the Stillaguamish River (at that time an outlet of the Sauk River) and Skagit Rivers. Subsequent erosion of lahar deposits near Darrington led to the current river system with the Stillaguamish River separated from the Sauk/Skagit Rivers. Lahar debris was deposited along both the Skagit and Stillaguamish Rivers all the way to Puget Sound. A small portion of the erupted tephra was deposited locally. However, most of the tephra reached higher levels of the atmosphere, and was transported by the wind hundreds of miles. Deposits from this congregation were as thick as  near Chelan and  near Missoula, Montana. The table below shows the three largest eruptions from this sequence.

Since these events, Glacier Peak has produced several lahars. The largest mudflows were 5,900 and 1,800 years ago and were associated with dome-building eruptions. In both cases, the lahars traveled down the Skagit River to Puget Sound.

Hazards 
The risk of an eruption in any given year is currently estimated as 1 in 1,000.

When lahars reach populated areas, they can bury structures and people. An example was the Armero tragedy at Nevado del Ruiz where 23,000 died from an enormous mudflow. Lahars from Glacier Peak pose a similar threat to the small communities of Darrington and Concrete and a lesser threat to the larger and rapidly growing towns of Mount Vernon and Burlington, as well as other communities along the lower Skagit and Stillaguamish Rivers. A 2005 study conducted by the United States Geological Survey identified nine Cascade volcanoes, including Glacier Peak, as "very-high-threat volcanoes with inadequate monitoring". At the time of the study, only one seismometer was installed on Glacier Peak that had not "worked in two years".

Climate

Glaciers 

Eleven significant glaciers cover Glacier Peak. When C.E. Rusk first saw these glaciers in 1906 they were beginning to retreat, but were still very advanced. Richard Hubley noted that North Cascade glaciers began to advance in the early 1950s, after 30 years of rapid retreat. The advance was in response to a sharp rise in winter precipitation and a decline in summer temperature beginning in 1944. Ten of the fifteen glaciers around Glacier Peak advanced, including all of the glaciers directly on the mountain's slopes. All eleven Glacier Peak glaciers that advanced during the 1950–79 period emplaced identifiable maximum advance terminal moraines. Milk Lake Glacier, on the north flank of the mountain, melted away altogether in the 1990s.

Recreation 
The Pacific Crest Trail passes near Glacier Peak.  The Suiattle River crossing is a well-known feature on the Pacific Crest Trail (PCT) as it passes through the area.  The Suiattle PCT crossing used to have a bridge crossing until it was flooded out by storms in late 2003.

The first recorded person to climb the mountain was Thomas Gerdine, along with a group of United States Geological Survey scientists, Sam Strom, A. H. Dubor, and Darcy Bard, in 1897. The climb is Alpine Grade I or II.

The trail is reached via Forest Service Road No. 23. The Sitkum Glacier ski route is rated blue to black diamond for both the ascent and the descent.

Cultural references 
The Seattle-based composer, Alan Hovhaness, dedicated his Symphony no.66 as "Hymn to Glacier Peak": see Symphony no.66 (Hovhaness).

See also

List of mountain peaks of North America
List of mountain peaks of the United States
List of mountain peaks of Washington (state)
List of highest points in Washington by county
List of Ultras of the United States
List of volcanoes in the United States

References

External links

 Glacier Peak on Ski Mountaineer.com
 
 
 University of Washington Libraries Digital Collections – The Mountaineers Collection Photographic albums and text documenting the Mountaineers official annual outings undertaken by club members from 1907 to 1951, primarily on the Olympic Peninsula, in Mount Rainier National Park and on Glacier Peak.

North American 3000 m summits
Stratovolcanoes of the United States
Cascade Range
Mountains of Washington (state)
Volcanoes of Washington (state)
VEI-5 volcanoes
Subduction volcanoes
Cascade Volcanoes
North Cascades of Washington (state)
Landforms of Snohomish County, Washington
Mountains of Snohomish County, Washington
Mount Baker-Snoqualmie National Forest
Religious places of the indigenous peoples of North America
Pleistocene stratovolcanoes
Holocene stratovolcanoes